The Munson Steamship Line, frequently shortened to the Munson Line, was an American steamship company that operated in the Atlantic Ocean primarily between U.S. ports and ports in the Caribbean and South America. The line was founded in 1899 as a freight line, added passenger service in 1919, and went out of business in 1937.

History
The Munson Steamship Line was founded in 1899 by Walter D. Munson, who built a freight line from New York to Havana into a line that encompassed eastern Cuba, Mexico, and ports on the Gulf of Mexico and operated over 60 cargo ships, and becoming the largest ocean freight company on the Eastern Seaboard. Walter Munson was succeeded first by his son Carlos, and later by his other son, Frank Munson, shortly after the end of World War I. The  , built by Maryland Steel in Baltimore, became the first passenger liner and was employed on the eastern Cuba route.

In 1904, the company's headquarters moved to the Beaver Building in lower Manhattan.

Munson acquired a British subsidiary, the Crossburn Steamship Company, with offices in Glasgow. When Britain entered the First World War in July 1914, Crossburn owned two UK-registered ships: Mundale, registered in Swansea, and the newly-built , registered in Glasgow. Both ships were transferred to the Munson Line's direct ownership and re-registered in New York.

In May 1921, the company moved to a new headquarters building, the Munson Building at 67 Wall Street and 85-97 Beaver Street.

In July 1921, four Type 535 class ships—, and —were assigned to the Munson Line by the USSB (and the former North German Lloyd ships were returned). In 1922, Martha Washington was returned to Italy after an act of Congress declared that she belonged to the Cosulich Line. , built at New York Shipbuilding of Camden, New Jersey, was added to Caribbean service in 1921.

In 1925, Munson Line bought outright the USSB ships. In 1931, Western World ran aground off the coast of Brazil, where she would remain for four months before finally arriving in New York for repairs. But the Great Depression dramatically reduced ocean traffic and the company slowly dwindled in size, laying up ships or scrapping them to save the costs of operating them.

In June 1934, Munson Steamship Line filed a petition for a reorganization under Section 77B of the Bankruptcy Act.

By 1937, the United States Maritime Commission, a successor to the USSB, had taken over the remaining ships of the troubled line when it declared bankruptcy in 1937.

Passenger steamships

This is a list of passenger vessels used by the Munson Line for Caribbean and South American routes:

Steamships owned and operated in 1929

South American service:
 
 
 
 

Cuban and/or coastwise service:
 
 
 
 
 
 

Gulf–Plate service:
  (British flag)
  (British flag)
 
 
 
 

Intercoastal service:
 
 
 

New York–Brazil service:
 
 
 

New York–Nassau service:
 

Baltimore–Jacksonville, Miami and Havana service:
 
 

Gulf–Cuba etc. service:
  (Panaman flag)
 
 
  (Norwegian flag)

Steamships owned as of February 2, 1937

General passenger and freight service between New York and various ports on the east coast of South America, with calls at Trinidad enroute northward:
 
 
 
 

General passenger and freight service between New York, Nassau, Miami and Havana:
 

Freight service between New Orleans and Progreso:
 

Carrying coal between ports on the Atlantic coast of the U.S.:
 
 
 

Status unknown:
 

Not in operation:

Notes

External links
 Munson Steamship Line at TheShipsList

Transport companies established in 1899
Defunct shipping companies of the United States
American companies established in 1899